South Carolina Highway 246 (SC 246) is a  primary state highway in the U.S. state of South Carolina.  It connects the communities and towns in eastern Greenwood County.

Route description

SC 246 is a two-lane rural highway that traverses from Friendship to Hodges; connecting the town of Ninety Six and the communities of Coronaca and Cokesbury. The highway also provides access to Star Fort Pond, at Ninety Six National Historic Site, via Kinard Road (S-24-27).

History

Established in 1930 as a replacement for part of SC 24, SC 246 traversed from Friendship to Ninety Six. From 1932-1933, U.S. Route 178 (US 178) was routed alongside SC 246.  In 1939, SC 246 was extended northwest to US 178 in Hodges. By 1942, SC 246 was extended northwest again along US 178 to Tinsley then west to SC 20/SC 185, in Due West; this marked the longest point for the highway.  In 1948, SC 246 was truncated back to Hodges, leaving behind Due West Road (S-24-31), Mount Lebanon Road (S-1-38) and Ellis Road (S-1-114).

Junction list

See also

References

External links

 
 Mapmikey's South Carolina Highways Page: SC 246

246
Transportation in Greenwood County, South Carolina